Thomas Anderson FLS (26 February 1832 – 26 October 1870) was a Scottish botanist who worked in India.

Life

Anderson was born in Edinburgh in 1832. He studied medicine at the University of Edinburgh, graduating with an MD in 1853. While at University he became interested in botany, and earned a gold medal for the best local collection of plants, and assisted in arranging the Indian herbarium. In 1854 he entered the Bengal medical service, and went to Calcutta. Subsequently, he went to Delhi, where he was actively engaged during the mutiny, returning to Calcutta in 1858. His health failing, he came home, and, the steamer being detained at Aden for some days, he made an interesting collection of the plants of that region, upon which he based his 'Florula Adenensis,’ published in 1860. About this time he returned to India, taking temporary charge of the Calcutta Botanic Garden during the absence of Dr Thomas Thomson, whom he afterwards succeeded as director. His brother, John Anderson was a zoologist.

He did much to improve the garden, and introduced valuable medicinal plants, especially cinchona and ipecacuanha: to him is due the institution of the experiments which led to the successful cultivation of the former in India, and he issued many valuable reports upon the subject. In 1864 he undertook to organise and superintend the forest department in Bengal, but after two years he was forced to abandon this work by the pressure of his other duties. In 1868 he was compelled by serious illness to return home, but subsequently recovered, and devoted himself with much energy to working out from herbaria and his own collections the flora of India. The difficult order Acanthaceae received his special attention; but before his work could be completed he was again attacked by illness, and died at Edinburgh of disease of the liver on 26 October 1870.

He is buried in Dean Cemetery in western Edinburgh. The grave lies facing the east–west path pointing at the pyramid, but is set behind the front line of stones.

Family

He was married to Elizabeth Cleghorn (1830-1914).

References

1832 births
1870 deaths
19th-century Scottish people
19th-century British botanists
Scottish botanists
Scientists from Edinburgh
Alumni of the University of Edinburgh Medical School
19th-century Scottish medical doctors
Burials at the Dean Cemetery